Abdulla Al Wahdani (Arabic:عبد الله الوحداني) (born 12 August 1995) is an Emirati footballer who plays as a winger for Al-Fujairah.

Career

Al-Wasl
Al Wahdani started his career at Al-Wasl and is a product of the Al-Wasl's youth system. On 26 May 2012, Al Wahdani made his professional debut for Al-Wasl against Al-Ahli in the Pro League, replacing Hamad Al-Hosani .

Masfout
On 31 May 2016, he left Al-Wasl and signed with Masfout .

Dibba Al-Hisn
On 12 January 2020, he left Masfout and signed with Dibba Al-Hisn .

Al-Fujairah
On 27 June 2020, he left Dibba Al-Hisn and signed with Al-Fujairah .

External links

References

1995 births
Living people
Emirati footballers
Al-Wasl F.C. players
Masfout Club players
Dibba Al-Hisn Sports Club players
Fujairah FC players
UAE Pro League players
UAE First Division League players
Association football wingers
Place of birth missing (living people)